Alireza Sabahifard is Iranian military officer who currently commands the Iran Air Defense Force of Artesh, Iran's regular military. He was appointed to the office by Ayatollah Ali Khamenei on 29 May 2018.

References 

Living people
1963 births
People from Qom
Commanders of Islamic Republic of Iran Army Air Defense
Islamic Republic of Iran Army brigadier generals
Islamic Republic of Iran Army personnel of the Iran–Iraq War